The Drama Desk Award for Outstanding Wig and Hair Design is an annual award presented since 2016 by the Drama Desk in recognition of achievements in the theatre among Broadway, off-Broadway, and off-off-Broadway productions. Unlike some Drama Desk Awards, the award for Outstanding Wig and Hair Design combines musicals and plays into a single category.

Winners and nominees

2010s

2020s

References

Wig and Hair Design